Andreas William Heinesen (15 January 1900 – 12 March 1991) was a poet, novel writer, short story writer, children's book writer, composer and painter from the Faroe Islands.

His writing 

The Faroese capital Tórshavn is always the centre of Heinesen's writing and he is famous for having once called Tórshavn "The Navel of the World". His writing focuses on contrasts between darkness and light, between destruction and creativity. Then following is the existential struggle of man to take sides. This is not always easy, however, and the lines between good and bad are not always clearly defined.

Heinesen was captivated by the mysterious part of life, calling himself religious in the broadest sense of the word. His life could be described as a struggle against defeatism with one oft-quoted aphorism of his is that "life is not despair, and death shall not rule".

Publications 

As he was born and raised before the Faroese language was taught in the schools, he wrote mainly in Danish but his spoken language was Faroese. All his books were later translated  into his native Faroese.

He published his first collection of poetry when he was 21 and he had three more published before he wrote his first novel Blæsende gry (Stormy Dawn) in 1934. He read every single one of the chapters to the painter Sámal Joensen-Mikines, as he was worried that his Danish was not good enough. That was followed up with Noatún (1938). Noatún has a strong political message – solidarity is the key to a good society. His next book The Black Cauldron (1949) deals with the aftermath of decadent living combined with religious hysteria. In The Lost Musicians (1950) Heinesen leaves the social realism of his earlier works behind, instead giving himself over to straightforward storytelling. Mother Pleiades (1952) is an ode to his imagination. Its subtitle is "a Story From the Beginning of Time".

Heinesen was not content with writing only novels. In the fifties he began writing short stories as well. Most of them have been printed in these three collections entitled The Enchanted Light, Gamaliel's Bewitchment and Cure Against Evil Spirits (1969). In the novel The Good Hope, his main character the Rev. Peder Børresen is based on the historical person Rev. Lucas Debes. When Heinesen was asked how long it had taken to write it, he answered "Forty years. But then I did other things in between."

Recognition 
He was awarded the Danish literary prize Holberg Medal in 1960.

He received The Nordic Council's Literature Prize in 1965 for his novel Det gode håb (The Good Hope), published in 1964. In the story Heinesen had the difficult task of reproducing 17th-century Danish. He succeeded, and won the prize. It is widely considered his best work.

When there were rumours that William Heinesen was about to receive the Nobel Prize for literature in 1981, he wrote to the Swedish Academy and renounced his candidacy. Later he explained why:

The Faroese language was once held in little regard – indeed it was suppressed outright. In spite of this, the Faroese language has created a great literature, and it would have been reasonable to give the Nobel Prize to an author who writes in Faroese. If it had been given to me, it would have gone to an author who writes in Danish, and in consequence Faroese efforts to create an independent culture would have been dealt a blow.

He was awarded with the Faroese Literature Prize in 1975.

In 1980 on his 80th birthday Heinesen was appointed "Tórshavn's Citizen of Honour" by his home town.

In 1980 he received the Danish Critics Prize for Literature (Kritikerprisen).

In 1984 he received the Children's Books Prize of Tórshavn City Council (Barnabókaheiðursløn Tórshavnar býráðs)

In 1985 he was awarded the Karen Blixen Medal from the Danish Academy.

In 1987 he was awarded the Swedish Academy Nordic Prize ("little Nobel").

Bibliography 
Information in this bibliography is taken from the Danish Literature Centre.

Poems 
 Arktiske Elegier og andre Digte  (Arctic Elegies and other Poems), Copenhagen 1921
 Høbjergningen ved Havet  (Haymaking by the Sea), Copenhagen 1924
 Sange mod Vaardybet  (Songs towards the Depths of Spring), Copenhagen 1927
 Stjernerne vaagner  (The Stars Awaken), Copenhagen 1930
 Den dunkle Sol  (The Dark Sun), Copenhagen 1936
 Digte i udvalg  (Selected Poems), Copenhagen 1955
 Hymne og harmsang  (Hymns and Songs of Indignation), Copenhagen 1961
 Panorama med regnbue  (Panorama with Rainbow), Copenhagen 1972
 Vinterdrøm. Digte i udvalg 1920–30  (Winter Dream. Selected Poems 1920–30), Copenhagen 1983
 Samlede digte  (Complete Poems), Copenhagen 1984
 Digte  (Poems), Copenhagen 1990

Short story anthologies 
 Det fortryllede lys  (The Enchanted Light), Copenhagen 1957
 Gamaliels besættelse  (Gamaliel Possessed), Copenhagen 1960
 Kur mod onde ånder  (A Cure for Evil Spirits), Copenhagen 1967
 Don Juan fra Tranhuset  (Don Juan from the Whale Oil Factory), Copenhagen 1970
 Fortællinger fra Thorshavn  (Tales from Tórshavn), Copenhagen 1973
 Grylen og andre noveller  (The Gryla and Other Stories), Copenhagen 1978
 Her skal danses  (Let There Be Dancing), Copenhagen 1980
 Laterna magica  (Laterna Magica), Copenhagen 1985
Laterna Magica. Fjord Press, 1987 -

Novels 
 Blæsende Gry  (Windswept Dawn), Copenhagen 1934
Windswept Dawn. Dedalus, 2009 - 
 Noatun  (Noatun), Copenhagen 1938
 Den sorte gryde  (The Black Cauldron), Copenhagen 1949
The Black Cauldron. Dedalus, 2000 - 
 De fortabte spillemænd  (The Lost Musicians), Copenhagen 1950
 The Lost Musicians (translated by W. Glyn Jones), Dedalus, 2006 - 
 Moder Syvstjerne  (The Kingdom of the Earth), Copenhagen 1952
 Mother Pleiades Dedalus, 2011 - 
 Det gode håb  (The Good Hope), Copenhagen 1964
 The Good Hope Dedalus, 2011 - 
 Tårnet ved verdens ende  (The Tower at the Edge of the World), Copenhagen 1976
 The Tower at the Edge of the World Dedalus, 2018 -

Heinesen's art on stamps

References

Other sources
 Hedin Brønner (1973) Three Faroese Novelists: An Appreciation of Jørgen-Frantz Jacobsen, William Heinesen, Heðin Brú (Ardent Media) 
Hazzard, Christinna. 2019. "Semi-Peripheral Realism: Nation and Form on the Borders of Europe." PhD Thesis, Liverpool John Moores University.

External links 

 Dansk Litteraturhistorisk Bibliografi
 Website about William Heinesen with bibliography
 Dedalus Books
 Dedalus Catalogue

Danish male novelists
1900 births
1991 deaths
Nordic Council Literature Prize winners
Faroese Literature Prize recipients
Faroese Children's Literature Prize recipients
Translators to Faroese
Faroese male novelists
Faroese short story writers
20th-century Faroese poets
People from Tórshavn
20th-century translators
20th-century Danish novelists
20th-century Faroese painters
Faroese male poets
20th-century Danish short story writers
Danish male short story writers
20th-century Danish male writers